Amastra cylindrica is a species of land snail, a terrestrial pulmonate gastropod mollusc in the Amastridae family. This species is endemic to Hawaii.

References

Molluscs of Hawaii
Amastra
Taxonomy articles created by Polbot